David Lawrence Haigh is a British human rights lawyer and international crisis and media manager.

Haigh is the former managing director of Leeds United Football Club and Chairman of Leeds United Ladies Football Club and was the first openly LGBTQ managing director of an English football club. He is the chief executive officer and founder of the Sport Capital Group, a financier of Leeds United Football Club. Haigh was convicted of fraud charges in Dubai and spent 22-months in prison, where he claims he was tortured and raped. He denies all allegations and claims he was set up. He is a campaigner for human rights and justice in the UAE, specifically on unfair trials, torture, Interpol and extraditions.

Haigh is the founder and managing director of Haigh International Justice, a dispute resolution, crisis and media management strategic advisor. He co-founded Legal Advocacy NGO Detained International in 2018. Haigh is an active campaigner for anti-homophobia in sport, credited with helping pave the way for LGBT players and managers in football.

Education 
Haigh attended Cape Cornwall School, England. He then studied at University of Southampton, where he graduated with a degree in law and attended law school at the College of Law in London.

Career 
Haigh is an international human rights lawyer, a solicitor of the Senior Court of England and Wales (non practising). He has practised law in the United Kingdom, the Caribbean and Dubai. He joined west Mayfair law firm Palmer Cowen (later Fairmays LLP) in 2001 and has worked at several international law firms including DLA Piper and US law firm Akin Gump.

Haigh was the co-founder, along with Radha Stirling, and managing partner of Stirling Haigh, an international dispute resolution, crisis management and strategic advisory firm.

He co-founded Detained International, a London-based legal advocacy NGO that provides pro bono legal advocacy to victims of injustice, inequality and other human rights violations in the UAE and the wider Middle East.

Haigh was Chairman of Conservatives Abroad UAE and Vice Chairman of Gulf Tories and as its Vice-Chairman.

Football
Haigh led GFH Capital's negotiations with the then-owner of Leeds United, Ken Bates, for the acquisition of the club. The agreement was formally announced at a press conference at Elland Road in November 2012. Haigh joined the Leeds United board in February 2013. On 1 July 2013, Haigh was made Managing Director of the club following the departure of now Football League CEO Shaun Harvey. On 11 April 2014, Haigh resigned as Managing Director following the purchase of the club by Massimo Cellino.

In November 2013 Haigh and Andre Flowers, managing director of Enterprise Insurance, formed a consortium called Sport Capital to purchase the majority of the shares in the club from GFH Capital. Haigh is said to have fallen out with GFH Capital after they sold the club to Italian businessman Massimo Cellino and not Sport Capital. Sport Capital Launched a £33.5 million claim against GFH Capital. Following the failure of the acquisition Sport Capital remained a financier of Leeds United.

After the Cornish non-league side Penzance AFC reached out to Haigh on social media looking for help, he joined the board as a committee member with the team sitting bottom of the South West Peninsula League Division One West, the 11th tier of English football.

LGBTQ+ Advocacy 
In 2013 Haigh became the first openly gay managing director of an English football club, Leeds United. In November 2017, Pink News credited Haigh along with Robbie Rogers and Thomas Hitzlsperger with paving the way for LGBTQ players and managers in football. In December 2013, Leeds United, became the first Stonewall Diversity Champion in English football, championing gay equality within the club and Football and former Leeds and LA Galaxy player Robbie Rogers, became one of the first male professional  football players to come out as gay, launching his Beyond It anti-discrimination charity with Haigh at Leeds United.

In 2017, Haigh, Diva and OutNewsGlobal publisher Linda Riley and Gay Times co-launched #ComeOut2Play to support LGBTQ footballers to come out. Come out to play achieved 40 million supporters in 6 weeks.

In 2017, Haigh was appointed to the Cornwall County Football Association Inclusivity Advisory Group in 2017 to advise on LGBTQ matters and diversity in Cornish football. In 2019 he joined the management board of the Cornwall County Football Association and became the Chairman of its Inclusivity Advisory group.

In 2020, Haigh was shortlisted for the National Diversity Awards – Positive Role Model for LGBTQ. He was nominated again in 2022 for the National Diversity Award – Positive Role Model LGBTQ and Positive Role Model Disability alongside Detained International.

Arrest, torture, and litigation in Dubai

In May 2014 Haigh was arrested in Dubai. Haigh claims that he was lured to Dubai by GFH to discuss a new job. His arrest related to allegations of fraud and embezzlement from his time at GFH Capital. Haigh was convicted of breach of trust charges in Dubai and spent 22-months in prison, where he claims he was tortured and raped. He denies all allegations and claims he was set up. According to Dubai Police he is alleged to have embezzled AED23.7 million (about US$6.7 million) from his former employers. The irregularities were allegedly discovered during a routine internal audit.

In August 2015, Haigh was convicted of "breach of trust" and received a two-year jail sentence.

Haigh was due to return to the UK following his earlier case when on the day of Haigh's release, Gulf Finance House filed a criminal complaint that Haigh had abused them on Twitter while in jail. Haigh was acquitted of this charge in March 2016, and returned to the UK a few days later on Good Friday where he gave a series of television and press interviews setting out the treatment, torture abuse and unfair trials he suffered.

Torture in Dubai 
In 2017 a UK court in Scotland held that Haigh had been tortured and raped by the police in Dubai, Haigh gave evidence in court at the Sheriffdom of Lothian and Borders at Edinburgh. Sheriff Thomas Welsh QC, presiding, accepted Haigh’s detailed testimony, saying “David Haigh struck me as an honest intelligent witness who gave his evidence with calm dignity. He was obviously a man who had been significantly physically and psychologically damaged by his ordeal in the UAE and was in the process of what I consider will be a long recovery.”

In July 2018, a Dubai judge Justice Jeremy Cooke in the Dubai International Finance Centre Courts in a hearing where Haigh was not present or represented held that Haigh had fraudulently directed funds. Haigh was ordered to pay nearly £3.8 million plus costs, and his counterclaims were dismissed. GFH said it would start enforcement proceedings against Haigh in Dubai and London.

Private prosecution 
While in Dubai Haigh hired English barrister Alun Jones QC and Thom Dyke and Keystone law Alison Bradley and Mark Spragg to file a private prosecution against GFH and their former lawyer Peter Gray of Gibson Dunn for human trafficking and fraud. Haigh withdrew the application when he lost access to lawyers. After his release from prison Haigh took the case to judicial review at the High Court in England, and the court ruled against him in May 2020.

Haigh's hired WikiLeaks lawyer Melinda Taylor and Alun Jones QC to take the UAE to the United Nations for breaches of his human rights including, torture, unfair trial, arbitrary detention and discrimination on grounds of sexuality.

Mental health 
Following release from jail in the UAE, Haigh has had a battle with PTSD. Haigh was reported to have felt "suicidal" whilst detained in 2015 following being tortured and raped. While imprisoned he spoke about these feelings with prisoner charity Prisoners Abroad.

Haigh spent two months in the Priory Hospital in 2015.

Pegasus hacking 
In August 2021, Amnesty International confirmed that Haigh was the first British person to have evidence on his mobile phone that it had been hacked by NSO spyware in August 2020. At the time, Haigh was representing hostage Dubai Princess Latifa bint Mohammed Al Maktoum. Haigh had been exchanging videos and text messages in secret for more than a year and a half with Latifa through a phone that had been smuggled into the Dubai villa where she was being held. She stopped responding on July 21, 2020, according to a screenshot of the messages Haigh shared. The analysis shows that Haigh’s phone was hacked two weeks later.

Charity 
In April 2013 Haigh completed a  arctic charity husky trail to raise funds for the Make-A-Wish Foundation, which supports his niece Sienna, who lives with the genetic disorder Homocystinuria. Haigh was also an ambassador for Make-A-Wish Foundation and established a foundation to help victims of suicide in Brazil following the suicide of his former partner in Brazil.

Haigh established Du Justice, a charity to provide funds to those in Dubai jails that cannot afford legal representation or food. Du Justice has since been merged with the David Haigh Foundation.

During Haigh's leadership Leeds United became the very first Stonewall Diversity Champion in English football, championing gay equality within the club and Football.

In November 2017, in an interview with Daily Mirror newspaper, he revealed that at least 20 footballers had confided in him about being gay. Haigh was open about being gay while in his role at Leeds United, and said to The Mirror that many gay players confided in him at the time as a result. In November 2017, Pink News credited Haigh along with Rogers and Hitzlsperger with paving the way for LGBT players and managers in football.

Haigh featured in the February 2020 Panorama documentary. He is identified by Princess Latifa bint Mohammed Al Maktoum as her representative in her fight for freedom. Haigh was interviewed on 60 minutes Australia and confirms he has been fighting for the princess's life and freedom for several years. He founded Detained International in 2018, a British NGO. Detained International has given evidence to United Nations working groups on illegal detentions, inhumane and degrading treatment of prisoners.

References

External links

Living people
Directors of football clubs in England
Human rights lawyers
English LGBT sportspeople
Victims of anti-LGBT hate crimes
Gay sportsmen
British people convicted of fraud
Prisoners and detainees of the United Arab Emirates
21st-century LGBT people
Year of birth missing (living people)